Obradovo is the name of several rural localities in Russia:
Obradovo, Tver Oblast, a village in Vyshnevolotsky District of Tver Oblast
Obradovo, Vologda Oblast, a village in Orlovsky Selsoviet of Velikoustyugsky District of Vologda Oblast